The Zinal Glacier is a  long glacier (2005) situated in the Pennine Alps in the canton of Valais in Switzerland. The glacier gives birth to the river La Navisence, which runs through a cave.

See also
List of glaciers in Switzerland
List of glaciers
Retreat of glaciers since 1850
Swiss Alps

External links

Swiss glacier monitoring network

Glaciers of Valais
Glaciers of the Alps